Thomas Spight (October 25, 1841 – January 5, 1924) was a U.S. Representative from Mississippi.

Born near Ripley, Mississippi, Spight attended the common schools, Ripley Academy, Purdy (Tennessee) College, and the La Grange (Tennessee) Synodical College where he was a member of the Sigma (original) chapter of the Sigma Chi Fraternity. He enlisted in the Confederate States Army as a private in 1861. He was promoted to the rank of lieutenant the same year. In 1862, he became captain of Company B, Thirty-fourth Regiment, Mississippi Volunteer Infantry, and served until the close of the war. He taught school and also engaged in agricultural pursuits. He studied law. He was admitted to the bar in 1875 and commenced practice in Ripley, Mississippi. He served as member of the Mississippi House of Representatives from 1874–1880. He established the Southern Sentinel in 1879, retiring from the newspaper business five years later. He served as prosecuting attorney of the third judicial district 1884–1892.

Spight was elected as a Democrat to the Fifty-fifth Congress to fill the vacancy caused by the resignation of William V. Sullivan. He was reelected to the Fifty-sixth and to the five succeeding Congresses and served from July 5, 1898, to March 3, 1911. He was an unsuccessful candidate for renomination in 1910. He again resumed the practice of his profession and also engaged in religious work until his death in Ripley, Mississippi, January 5, 1924. He was interred in Ripley Cemetery.

References

External links 
 

1841 births
1924 deaths
Confederate States Army officers
Democratic Party members of the United States House of Representatives from Mississippi
Democratic Party members of the Mississippi House of Representatives
People from Ripley, Mississippi